Tayeb Tizini (August 10, 1934 – May 18, 2019) was a Syrian philosopher, researcher and academic. born in the city of Homs, a supporter of Marxist nationalist thought. He relies on the historical dialectic in his philosophical project to re-read Arab thought since before Islam until now. He died at the age of 85 after struggle with disease in his city, Homs.

Life
In his 1976 work,  ('From tradition to revolution'), Tizini hoped for a Marxist revolution.

Tizini's 2001 critique of the Damascus Spring,  ('From the trilogy of corruption to issues of civil society'), argued that reform of the state was needed, rather than putting excessive hope in civil society. He nevertheless signed the 2005 Damascus Declaration and the 2006 Beirut-Damascus Declaration.

After demonstrating to demand the release of political prisoners at the start of the Syrian uprising in March 2011, he was beaten and briefly held by the state security forces. In October 2011 he participated in the national conference convened by the regime in Damascus. He listed five demands as a precondition for national dialogue: no firing at fellow Syrians; release of political prisoners; applying the rule of law; abandoning the security state; and reconstructing the media for a real national debate.

He died in Homs on May 17, 2019.

important works

in German  
 Introduction to Medieval Arabic Philosophy 1972 Berlin.

In Arabic 
 'A project of a new vision for the Arabic thought in the medieval era'(), Damascus house, Damascus, 1971, five prints
 About the problems of culture and revolution in the third world – the Arabic world as an example, Damascus house, Damascus, 1971, three prints.
 From heritage to revolution – a proposed theory in Arabic heritage, Ibn khaldoun house, Beirut, 1976, three prints.
 Roger Garoudi after silence, Ibn khaldoun house, Beirut, 1973.
 Between philosophy and heritage  the author himself, 1980.
 The history of ancient and medieval philosophy, with ghassan finance, Damascus University, 1981.
 Political and social thought: research in modern and contemporary Arabic thought, Damascus University, 1981.
 A project for a new vision of the Arabic thought from its beginnings to contemporary era in 12 parts, Damascus house, Damascus, 1982
 Arabic Thought in its beginnings and its early horizons, a project for a new vision of the Arabic thought, part2, Damascus house, Damascus, 1982.
 "From Yahweh to God", a project for a new vision of the Arabic thought, part3, Damascus house, Damascus, 1985.
 Studies in the ancient philosophical thought, Damascus University, 1988.
 Ibn Rushd and his philosophy with the text of the dialogue between Muhammad Abduh and Farah Anton, authored by Farah Anton,  introduction by Tayyeb Tizini, Dar Alfarabi, Beirut, 1988.
 On the recent intellectual controversy: about some of the issues of the Arabic heritage, a method and application, Dar Alfike Aljadid, Beirut, 1989.
 On the Road to Methodological Clarity – writings in philosophy and Arabic thought(), Dar Alfarabi, Beirut, 1989.
 Chapters in political Arabic thought, Dar Alfarabi, Beirut, 1989, two prints.
 A preliminary introduction to early Mohammedan Islam – origination and foundation, a project for a new vision of Arabic thought, part 4, Damascus house, Damascus, 1994.
 From Western Orientalism to Moroccan Occidentalism – a study in Ajaberi's reading of Arabic thought and its historical horizons, Dar Alzakera, Homs, 1996.
 The Qur'anic Text and the Problematic of its Structure and Reading, a project for a new vision of Arabic thought, part 5, Dar Alyanabee, Damascus, 1997. 
 From the Trinity of Corruption to the Issue of the Civil Society, Dar Gafra, Damascus, 2002.
 From theology to medieval Arabic philosophy, Ministry of Culture prints, Syria, 2005.
 A Declaration in Arabic Renaissance and Enlightenment, Dar Alfarabi, 2005.

References

External links
 Tayyeb Tizini: Syria's Foremost Thinker

1934 births
2019 deaths
Syrian philosophers
Syrian Marxists
Marxist writers
Syrian writers